Phoronix Test Suite (PTS) is a free and open-source benchmark software for Linux and other operating systems which is developed by Michael Larabel and Matthew Tippett.
The Phoronix Test Suite has been endorsed by sites such as Linux.com, LinuxPlanet, and Softpedia.

Features 

 Supports over 220 test profiles and over 60 test suites;
 Uses an XML-based testing architecture. Tests include MEncoder, FFmpeg and lm sensors along with OpenGL games such as Doom 3, Nexuiz, and Enemy Territory: Quake Wars, and many more.
 Contains a feature called PTS Global where users are able to upload their test results and system information for sharing. Then through executing a single command, other users can compare their test results to a selected system in an easy-comparison mode;
 Allows report benchmark results to the Phoronix Global online database;
 Allows to compare results side-by-side;
 Is extensible and new tests can be added easily;
 Can do anonymous usage reporting;
 Can do automated Git bisecting on a performance basis to find performance regressions. It features statistical significance verification.

Components

Phoromatic 
Phoromatic is a web-based remote test management system for the Phoronix Test Suite. It allows the automatic scheduling of tests. It's aimed at the enterprise. It can manage multiple test nodes simultaneously within a test farm or distributed environment.

Phoromatic Tracker 
Phoromatic Tracker is an extension of Phoromatic that provides a public interface into test farms. Currently their reference implementations autonomously monitor the performance of the Linux kernel on a daily basis, Fedora Rawhide and Ubuntu.

PTS Desktop Live 
PTS Desktop Live was a stripped down x86-64 Linux distribution, which included Phoronix Test Suite 2.4. It was designed for testing/benchmarking computers from a LiveDVD / LiveUSB environment.

Phodevi 
Phodevi (Phoronix Device Interface) is a library that provides a clean, stable, platform-independent API for accessing software and hardware information.

PCQS 
Phoronix Certification & Qualification Suite (PCQS) is a reference specification for the Phoronix Test Suite.

Phoronix website 

Phoronix is a technology website that offers insights regarding the development of the Linux kernel, product reviews, interviews, and news regarding free and open-source software by monitoring the Linux kernel mailing list or interviews.

Phoronix was started in June 2004 by Michael Larabel, who currently serves as the owner and editor-in-chief.

History 
Founded on 5 June 2004, Phoronix started as a website with a handful of hardware reviews and guides, moving to articles covering operating systems based on Linux and open source software around the start of 2005, such as Ubuntu, Fedora, SUSE and Mozilla (Firefox/Thunderbird). Phoronix heavily focuses on benchmarking hardware running Linux, with a heavy slant towards graphics articles that monitor and compare free and open-source graphics device drivers and Mesa 3D with AMD's and Nvidia's proprietary graphics device drivers. In June 2006 the website added forums in addition to news content. On 20 April 2007, Phoronix redesigned its website, and began Solaris hardware reviews and news in addition to Linux content.

Phoronix benchmarks have been cited by a number of other technical publications such as CNET News.

Open Benchmarking 
OpenBenchmarking.org is a web-based service created to work with the Phoronix Test Suite. It is a collaborative platform that allows users to share their hardware and software benchmarks through an organized online interface.

Release history 
On 5 June 2008, Phoronix Test Suite 1.0 was released under the codename Trondheim. This 1.0 release was made up of 57 test profiles and 23 test suites.

On 3 September 2008, Phoronix Test Suite 1.2 was released with support for the OpenSolaris operating system and a module framework accompanied by tests focusing upon new areas and many new test profiles.

Phoronix Test Suite 1.8 includes a graphical user interface (GUI) using GTK+ written using the PHP-GTK bindings.

3.4 includes MATISK benchmarking module and initial support for the GNU Hurd.

See also 

 Inquisitor
 Stresslinux

References

External links 
 

2008 software
Benchmarking software for Linux
Benchmarks (computing)
Free software programmed in PHP